Sdot Negev Regional Council (Mo'atza Azorit Sdot Negev, lit. Negev Fields Regional Council), formerly  Azata Regional Council (Mo'atza Azorit Azata) is a regional council in the northwestern Negev desert in the Southern District of Israel.

History
The Sdot Negev region council was established in 1951 by the Religious Zionist HaPoel HaMizrahi settlement movement. The council encompasses 16 communities: two kibbutzim, 12 moshavim and two community settlements.

Despite frequent rocket attacks from the nearby Gaza Strip, the population of the Sdot Negev region has increased 55 percent in 2006–2012. Residents have cited the educational system, atmosphere and rural lifestyle as incentives for moving to this part of the Negev.

List of communities
Kibbutzim: Alumim · Sa'ad
Moshavim: Beit HaGadi · Givolim · Kfar Maimon · Mlilot · Sharsheret · Shibolim · Shokeda · Shuva · Tkuma · Yoshivia · Zru'a · Zimrat
Community settlements: Ma'agalim · Tushia

References

External links
Official website 

 
Regional councils in Israel
1951 establishments in Israel